Austin Nichols (born April 24, 1980) is an American actor and director, known for his role as Julian Baker in The CW drama series One Tree Hill. He is also known for his roles in the films The Day After Tomorrow and Wimbledon. He starred as John Monad in the HBO drama series John from Cincinnati, and portrayed Spencer Monroe in the AMC horror drama series The Walking Dead.

Early life
Nichols was born in Ann Arbor, Michigan, and moved to Austin, Texas before his first birthday. He was named after the Austin Nichols distilling company, producers of Wild Turkey bourbon. His father, David Nichols, is a radiologist, and his mother, Kay (née Vermeulen), was a professional trick water skier. Kay was a national champion ten times and an international champion once. He has one older sister, Ashley. Nichols was raised near Lake Austin and attended Casis Elementary School. Nichols began competitive water skiing from the age of two. He represented the United States junior water ski team in the Pan-American Championships in 1997, and was also on the United States junior Olympic water skiing team. At age thirteen, he was ranked third in the world. Nichols had intended to become a professional water skier until he injured his shoulder in Florida, and was forced to give up the sport. While at McCallum High School in Austin, he played basketball but was "absolutely awful". Nichols' interest in acting was sparked when he was fifteen and began to take acting lessons. He moved to Los Angeles after high school.

Acting career

Beginnings
His acting career began when he gate-crashed a party at the Sundance Film Festival and was signed by a manager. Nichols initially wished to attend the University of Texas, but moved to Los Angeles after his signing and enrolled at the University of Southern California, graduating in 2002 with a Bachelor of Arts degree in English. Although Nichols had guest appearances in Sliders, Odd Man Out, CSI: Crime Scene Investigation, Family Law, Watching Ellie, and Wolf Lake before his graduation, his big break came in 2002 when he appeared as Brenda Chenowith's lover in two episodes of Six Feet Under. He had previously appeared in two films, Durango Kids in 1999 and Holiday in the Sun in 2001.

In his first critically successful film role, Nichols starred as a stereotypical "frat boy" in The Utopian Society, a 2003 independent film directed by John P. Aguirre, which won several awards and some critical acclaim. One critic wrote that Nichols "transforms himself from a cardboard jock and frat boy caricature to a likeable vulnerable human being with surprising sensibilities." Aguirre commended Nichols as a "stellar talent" able to play his character "with total abandon to self ego."

Box office and critical success
In 2004, Nichols was cast as J.D., an intelligent rich kid and romantic rival to Jake Gyllenhaal's main character in the environmental blockbuster, The Day After Tomorrow. The film received negative reviews but was a box office success. Also in 2004, he appeared in Wimbledon, opposite Kirsten Dunst and Paul Bettany. The film was well received by critics, though it was only a mild success at the U.S. box office. Nichols' acting as Jake Hammond, an arrogant tennis pro, was described as "effectively unlikeable". For the role, Nichols had to learn tennis from scratch; he was trained to look professional by Pat Cash, who was taken aback by Nichols' skill. Cash observed, "It's absolutely as good as anybody's on the circuit. I swear to God. He hits it like a bullet. He's our star pupil." By the end of their training, Nichols and Bettany were able to have rallies and play points, although some of their more intricate exchanges were computer generated.

After this success, Nichols then had a minor role in an obscure and panned 2005 film, Thanks to Gravity. Nichols followed this with short guest spots on episodes of Pasadena and Surface, before being cast in a successful 2006 film, Glory Road. Glory Road, directed by James Gartner and starring Josh Lucas, is a film based on the true story of the 1966 NCAA Men's Division I Basketball Championship, in which Coach Don Haskins led a team with an all-black starting lineup, a first in NCAA history. Nichols played one of the few white players on the team; he trained heavily for the role and had to master basketball as it was played in the 1960s, saying "I'd never been so sore in my life." The film made $42.9 million at the box office and received mixed reviews.

The House of Usher and beyond
Nichols' next film was the 2006 thriller The House of Usher, directed by Hayley Cloake, and based on the story by Edgar Allan Poe. He played the disturbed Roderick Usher, who was described by Nichols as a "twisted, terminally ill, fucked-up guy". The House of Usher was released in September 2007. Nichols also portrayed Neal Cassady, with Will Estes as Jack Kerouac, in the short film Luz del mundo.

In April 2006, Nichols guest starred in Deadwood, an HBO Western series. Shortly afterward, Nichols signed a holding deal with HBO. In August of that year, Nichols was cast as the lead in a new series, John From Cincinnati, a surfing drama created by David Milch, who also produced Deadwood. The series began airing in June 2007, but was cancelled after one season due to poor ratings and mixed critical reviews. Nichols played John Monad, a stranger who suddenly appears in a quiet surfing town. Nichols took up surfing and practiced every day for three months for this role.

In 2007, Nichols appeared in a few episodes of the NBC drama series Friday Night Lights, before being cast as Julian Baker in The CW's teen drama One Tree Hill. He was upgraded to series regular for the seventh season. He directed two episodes of the series including the seventh episode of the ninth and last season. In 2013, Austin landed the role of Tommy Wheeler in the Showtime series Ray Donovan. Nichols then had a recurring role as Spencer Monroe in AMC's horror series The Walking Dead, before being promoted to a series regular. He will recur as Sam Loomis in the fifth and final season of A&E's drama-thriller series Bates Motel.

Personal life
Alongside his acting career, Nichols maintains a strong interest in cinema. He keeps a log of every film he sees. He said "I take it to the movies and write down who does the music, edits, directs, and how long the film is." Claire Oswalt, an ex-girlfriend, said in a 2003 interview that Nichols watches an average of 20 movies a week. He especially admires Hal Ashby, Sam Fuller, and John Ford.

He was previously in an on and off relationship with One Tree Hill co-star Sophia Bush from 2006 to 2012 and took the role of Julian Baker in the series to be closer to her. He also dated the actress Chloe Bennet from 2014 to 2017 after meeting on the set of Marvel's Agents of Shield where he played her ex-boyfriend, Miles.

Nichols has been friends with actor Jake Gyllenhaal since the two met on the set of The Day After Tomorrow in 2004. Nichols said in one interview, "I've learned a ton from Jake. He's a really sharp guy. He told me everything about acting, the business, girls, life."

Filmography

Film

Television

References

External links

 
 
 
 

1980 births
20th-century American male actors
21st-century American male actors
Actors from Ann Arbor, Michigan
American male film actors
American male television actors
American television directors
American water skiers
Living people
Male actors from Austin, Texas
University of Southern California alumni